George William Anderson (1791 – 12 March 1857) was the officiating governor of Bombay during the British Raj from 28 April 1841 to 9 June 1842.

Anderson entered the Bombay Civil Service in 1806. He was responsible for drawing up the Bombay Civil Code of 1827 and served as a judge in the Sadr Diwani and Sadr Faujdari courts. In 1838, he was named to the Indian Law Commission and from 1843 to 1846 was President of the Bombay Branch of the Royal Asiatic Society. He was knighted in 1849.

He was 7th Governor of Mauritius from 8 June 1849 until 19 October 1850, when he was appointed governor of Ceylon, following the harsh suppression of the 1848 civil uprising by the previous office holder, Viscount Torrington. He resigned in 1855.

References

Governors of Bombay
Governors of British Ceylon
1857 deaths
1791 births
Burials at Kensal Green Cemetery
British people in colonial India